The rufous hornbill (Buceros hydrocorax), also known as the Philippine hornbill and locally as kalaw (pronounced KAH-lau), is a large species of hornbill endemic to the Philippines (the largest hornbill in the country). The are referred by locals as the "clock-of-the-mountains" due to its large booming call which typically occur of every hour. It occurs in moist tropical lowland forest. They are now considered to be a threatened species and its reasons for decline being habitat destruction, hunting and poaching for the illegal pet trade.

It is illegal to hunt, capture or possess rufous hornbills under Philippine Law RA 9147.

Distribution and Taxonomy
It is endemic to the Philippines, where it occurs in primary, mature secondary and disturbed forests on 11 islands:

The bill of the nominate subspecies is entirely red, while the bill of the subspecies semigaleatus and mindanensis are pale yellow on the distal half.

Subspecies 
Three subspecies are recognized"

 Buceros hydrocorax hydrocorax:  Luzon and Marinduque, Larger with an all red bill, large casque Now extinct on Marinduque
 Buceros hydrocorax semigaelatus:Samar, Leyte, Bohol, Panaon, Biliran, Calicoan and Buad ; Yellow front half of beak; flatter top of head with the casque (horn) smaller and merges into the maxilla
 Buceros hydrocorax mindanensis: Dinagat, Siargao, Mindanao (plus Balut, Bucas and Talicud) and Basilan; Yellow front half of beak; large casque

The HBW and BirdLife International Illustrated Checklist of the Birds of the World has split this into two species with the Northern Rufous Hornbill consisting of the nominate and the Southern Rufous Hornbill consisting of the semigaelatus and mindanensis subspecies.

Behaviour
It is sometimes called "the clock of the mountains" because of its periodic noontime call. It has been recorded to have been preyed upon by the Philippine eagle.

Breeding
As with other hornbills, females seal themselves within the nest cavity, where they lay the clutch, and remain with the growing young for most or all of the nesting period.  In some species, the male helps with the sealing process from outside the nest cavity. The nestlings and the female are fed by the male through a narrow vertical slit in the sealed nest opening, at times joined by non-breeding helper males. 
Nesting time  will last in average of 4–6 months. In this duration the male will provide food to his confine female and nestling. They maintain the year- pair bonds and will paired together until many years’ time and engage a courtship feeding.

Feeding 
Rufous Hornbills play a crucial role in maintaining the balance of their ecosystem. They are considered a keystone species due to their omnivorous feeding habits, which allow them to disperse seeds along the forest floor from the fruits they consume and control pest populations of insects they predate on.

Habitat and Conservation Status
This species occurs largely in primary evergreen dipterocarp forests, but also uses secondary forest. The Northern rufous hornbill has  recorded up to 760 meters in Luzon while its southern counterpart has been recorded up to 2,100 meters above sea level on Mt. Apo.

This species has been classified as vulnerable. It is believed that the North Rufous Hornbill is more threatened as the National List of Threatened Terrestrial Fauna of the Philippines has classified it and Endangered while classifying the southern species or sub-species as Vulnerable.

This species suffers from substantial hunting pressure and widespread loss of habitat as a result of logging and conversion to agriculture. Continued subsistence hunting and felling of remnant dipterocarp forests for agriculture are thought to be further depressing population numbers, and the range is now highly fragmented and likely suffering from an acute lack of suitable nesting trees, at least in parts of the range. Hunters climb up nesting trees to capture the mother and its chicks for the illegal wildlife trade. Hunting for sport and food has been recorded throughout its range. In 2014 Adams, Ilocos Norte in which the Vice-Mayor's son was photographed carrying a deceased juvenile that he just shot.  This species has gone locally extinct in Cavite in Mt. Palay-palay due to hunting and the construction of roads and the Kaybiang Tunnel.

References

  4. Clarido, Aiza P. (2017). Dark-winged Clock: Hornbill

rufous hornbill
Endemic birds of the Philippines
rufous hornbill
rufous hornbill